
Gmina Piotrków Kujawski is an urban-rural gmina (administrative district) in Radziejów County, Kuyavian-Pomeranian Voivodeship, in north-central Poland.

The gmina contains part of the protected area called Gopło Landscape Park.

Villages
Apart from the town of Piotrków Kujawski, Gmina Piotrków Kujawski contains the villages and settlements of Anusin, Bycz, Czarnotka, Dębołęka, Gradowo, Higieniewo, Jerzyce, Kaczewo, Kaspral, Katarzyna, Kozy, Łabędzin, Lubsin, Malina, Nowa Wieś, Palczewo, Połajewek, Połajewo, Przedłuż, Przewóz, Rogalin, Rudzk Duży, Rudzk Mały, Rzeczyca, Stawiska, Świątniki, Szewce, Teodorowo, Trojaczek, Wincentowo, Wójcin, Zakręta and Zborowiec.

Neighbouring gminas
Gmina Piotrków Kujawski is bordered by the gminas of Bytoń, Kruszwica, Radziejów, Skulsk, Topólka and Wierzbinek.

References
Polish official population figures 2006

Piotrkow Kujawski
Radziejów County